James Ashton may refer to:

 James Ashton (artist) (1859–1935), artist and arts educator in South Australia
 James Ashton (politician) (1864–1939), Australian politician
 James Ashton (Royal Navy officer) (1883–1951)
 James Henry Ashton, circus proprietor in Australia
 Jim Ashton (1891–1961), Australian footballer